The New York Dream Center is a church in New York City which was founded in the summer of 2008 as an offshoot of the LA Dream Center church.  The church's current pastors are Stella Reed and her husband Brad Reed who also serves as the church's manager.  Both were formerly part of the LA Dream Center's leadership.  The church currently has 501(c)(3) non-profit status.

Locations 
Originally located at the New York City Lab School for Collaborative Studies in Chelsea, Manhattan, the church opened a second location in Bushwick, Brooklyn in 2019.  The church also runs additional programs throughout New York City including the Dream Center Leadership Program which focuses on five key elements: "The Gospel", "Serving Communities", "City Outreach", "Our Calling", and "Sharing the Gospel".

Stated goals 
The church's stated mission is "to walk alongside people right where they are, to where God dreams for them to be."

References

External links 
 Chelsea Housing
 The Midtown Gazette
 Broadway World
 Who we are

Churches in Manhattan